Live Free or Die Hard (released as Die Hard 4.0 outside North America) is a 2007 American action-thriller film directed by Len Wiseman, and serves as the fourth installment in the Die Hard film series. It is based on the 1997 article "A Farewell to Arms" written for Wired magazine by John Carlin. The film's name is adapted from New Hampshire's state motto, "Live Free or Die".

In the film, NYPD Detective John McClane (Bruce Willis) attempts to stop a cyber-terrorist (Timothy Olyphant) who hacks into government and commercial computers across the United States with the goal of starting a "fire sale" cyber attack that would disable key elements of the nation's infrastructure. Justin Long, Cliff Curtis, and Maggie Q also star.

Live Free or Die Hard was released in the United States on June 27, 2007. The film grossed $388 million worldwide, making it the highest-grossing installment in the Die Hard series. It received generally positive reviews from critics, who called the film a return to form for the series. It is the only Die Hard film to be theatrically released with a PG-13 rating from the MPAA, although an unrated edition would later be made available on home media. A fifth film, A Good Day to Die Hard, was released in 2013.

Plot
Responding to a brief computer outage at its Cyber-Security Division by tracking down top computer hackers, the FBI, led by Deputy Director Miguel Bowman, asks NYPD detective John McClane to go to New Jersey to bring in hacker Matthew Farrell. McClane arrives just in time to save him from assassins sent by Mai Linh, who is the lover and accomplice of Thomas Gabriel, a hacker and leader of the terrorists.

On the way to D.C., Farrell tells McClane he had written an algorithm for Linh to crack a specific security system for white hat purposes. Meanwhile, Gabriel orders his crew of hackers to take over transportation grids and the stock market, while nationally broadcasting a threatening message to the U.S. government. Farrell realizes this is the start of a "fire sale", a cyber attack designed to disable the nation's infrastructure. As McClane and Farrell are driven to DHS headquarters, Linh, posing as a dispatcher, reroutes them into a helicopter ambush. McClane fends off the attackers, destroying the helicopter and all but one of the terrorists.

Desperate, McClane asks Farrell what would be Gabriel's next move. He deduces Gabriel's next target is the power grid, so they drive to a utility superstation in West Virginia. They find the superstation under control by a team led by Linh. McClane kills all but Linh. After an intense, violent struggle between the two, Linh, trapped in a car, is killed when the vehicle falls down an elevator shaft.

While Farrell is working on the hub computer to slow down the damage done, he is able to trace Gabriel and uploads his picture. He then sends it to Bowman at the FBI. McClane is shocked to learn that Bowman and Gabriel once worked together at the U.S. Department of Defense. Gabriel was the chief programmer for infrastructural security. He warned the department of weaknesses that made America's network infrastructure vulnerable to cyberwarfare, but he was ignored and his unorthodox methods got him fired, and he is out for revenge. Enraged over Linh's death, Gabriel redirects large amounts of natural gas to the superstation to kill McClane and Farrell, and they barely escape.

McClane and Farrell then travel by helicopter to the home of super hacker, Frederick "Warlock" Kaludis in Baltimore. Warlock identifies the piece of code Farrell wrote for Linh as a means to access data at a Social Security Administration building at Woodlawn, Maryland. He confirms Gabriel's former ties as a government employee. Doing a traceroute, Warlock locates Gabriel.

The Woodlawn building is actually an NSA facility intended to back up the nation's personal and financial records in the event of a cyber attack and designed by Gabriel himself. The attack on the FBI triggered a download of financial data to Woodlawn, data which Gabriel plans to steal. Meanwhile, ordered by Gabriel, one of his top men kills all but one of his computer hackers after they've outlived their usefulness. Gabriel then taps into the connection they made, which reveals the location of McClane's estranged daughter Lucy, whom he kidnaps. McClane and Gabriel then meet - virtually - McClane telling him he will lose.

McClane and Farrell race to the Woodlawn facility. Farrell finds the facility's main server and encrypts the data Gabriel's men downloaded before getting captured. Gabriel then takes Farrell and Lucy with him as he flees. McClane pursues them, hijacking their semi mobile base. Accessing the communication system of an F-35B Lightning II, Gabriel orders the pilot to attack the truck McClane is driving, but the jet is destroyed by falling debris. McClane barely survives and sees Gabriel's vehicle pull into a nearby hangar. He contacts the FBI and orders the director to storm the facility where Gabriel is situated and rescue his daughter if he doesn't make it out alive.

There, Gabriel demands that Farrell decrypt the financial data. When he refuses, Gabriel shoots him in the knee and threatens to kill Lucy. McClane arrives, killing two of Gabriel's men, but he is shot in the shoulder by Gabriel's last man, Emerson. Gabriel positions himself behind McClane, putting the barrel of the gun in his shoulder wound. McClane then pulls the trigger. The bullet travels through McClane's shoulder and hits Gabriel in the heart, killing him instantly. Farrell then grabs a pistol and kills Emerson as the FBI arrives. Afterwards, McClane thanks Farrell for saving Lucy's life, who takes a romantic interest in him.

Cast
 Bruce Willis as Detective John McClane of the NYPD.  He becomes involved in stopping Thomas Gabriel after being tasked with transporting Matt Farrell to the FBI for questioning.  He saves Farrell from a hit squad and the two work together to stop Gabriel's plan.
 Justin Long as Matthew "Matt" Farrell, a hacker-turned-white hat who now designs cyber-security algorithms.  He unknowingly helped Thomas Gabriel with his plan and survives an assassination attempt with McClane's help.  He uses his computer expertise to help McClane stop Gabriel's plan.   
 Timothy Olyphant as Thomas Gabriel, a former Defense Department analyst who leads a group of cyber-terrorists systematically shutting down the entire U.S. infrastructure. Olyphant filmed his role within three weeks.
 Mary Elizabeth Winstead as Lucy Gennero-McClane, McClane's estranged daughter. The inclusion of McClane's daughter was previously considered for the third film, and she was in the video game Die Hard: Vendetta. 
 Maggie Q as Mai Linh, Gabriel's second-in-command and lover
 Kevin Smith as Frederick "Warlock" Kaludis, a hacker who reluctantly helps McClane and Farrell track down Gabriel.  Smith made uncredited rewrites to the scenes in which he appears.
 Cliff Curtis as Miguel Bowman, Deputy Director of the FBI Cyber Security Division.  
 Jonathan Sadowski as Trey, Gabriel's main hacker
 Edoardo Costa as Emerson, Gabriel's henchman
 Cyril Raffaelli as Rand, Gabriel's acrobatic henchman
 Yorgo Constantine as Russo, Gabriel's henchman
 Željko Ivanek as Agent Molina, Bowman's right hand man.  
 Christina Chang as Taylor
 Len Wiseman as the F-35B pilot (cameo)
Additional characters include Gabriel's henchmen: Chris Palmero as Del, Andrew Friedman as Casper and Bryon Weiss as Robinson. Chris Ellis appears as Jack Sclavino, McClane's superior officer. Sung Kang makes an appearance as Raj, a desk officer of FBI's cyber division. Matt O'Leary appears as Clay, a hacker who unwittingly gives Gabriel a code, allowing his house to be destroyed. Jake McDorman plays a small role as Jim, Lucy's boyfriend. Tim Russ appears as an NSA agent. Rosemary Knower has a cameo as Mrs. Kaludis, Frederick's mother.

Production

Unproduced Die Hard 4: Tears of the Sun sequel

After the success they had with Die Hard With a Vengeance, and after many discussions with Bruce Willis, 20th Century Fox started working on the fourth Die Hard film. As they did with original scripts for the previous three films, Fox and Willis decided to pick a script which was not written as a Die Hard film and then have it changed into the next sequel. In 1997, they picked up a script titled Tears of the Sun, an action-adventure written by Alan B. McElroy, which Willis really liked and wanted to turn into Die Hard 4. The script was about a group of people who go to set up a radio relay station deep inside the Amazon jungle; due to a severe storm, they land in a small mining town where they hire a guide. However, they are soon captured by a drug lord and his gang, who force them to work as slaves in his mine. They manage to escape and have to survive both the jungle and drug dealers who are chasing them.

At the time Fox decided to rework the story into Die Hard 4, Tears of the Sun had been in development since the early 1990s. Around 1994, it was one of several projects to which John Woo was attached as a director, but which never got made. Besides McElroy, some of the other writers who worked on the Tears of the Sun script over the years included Ronald Bass, Chris Gerolmo, Larry Ferguson, Robert Mark Kamen and Joel Gross. It was also at one point considered to be re-written into a new modern adaptation of Tarzan, before Fox got the script.

Interestingly, one of the first rejected scripts for the third Die Hard film, written by John Milius, also took place in the jungle. As with that script, the Tears of the Sun version of Die Hard 4 was never made.

Willis liked the Tears of the Sun title so much that he requested that one of his films, made in 2002, be re-titled Tears of the Sun (instead of Hostile Rescue or Man of War) in exchange for starring in another Die Hard film. This is why it is often mistakenly reported that Tears of the Sun was originally going to be the fourth Die Hard film.

Script and title
The film's plot is based on an earlier script entitled WW3.com by David Marconi, screenwriter of the 1998 film Enemy of the State. Using John Carlin's Wired magazine article entitled "A Farewell to Arms", Marconi crafted a screenplay about a cyber-terrorist attack on the United States. The fictional attack concept is called "fire sale" in the movie, depicting a three-stage coordinated attack on a country's transportation, telecommunications, financial, and utilities infrastructure systems. After the September 11, 2001 attacks, the project was stalled, only to be resurrected several years later and rewritten into Live Free or Die Hard by Doug Richardson and eventually by Mark Bomback.

Willis said in 2005 that the film would be called Die Hard 4.0, as it revolves around computers and cyber-terrorism. IGN later reported the film was to be called Die Hard: Reset instead. 20th Century Fox later announced the title as Live Free or Die Hard and set a release date of June 29, 2007 with filming to begin in September 2006. The title is based on New Hampshire's state motto, "Live Free or Die", which is attributed to a quote from General John Stark. International trailers use the Die Hard 4.0 title, as the film was released outside North America with that title. Early into the film's DVD commentary, both Wiseman and Willis note a preference for the title Die Hard 4.0.

Visual effects
For the visual effects used throughout the film, actor Bruce Willis and director Len Wiseman stated that they wanted to use a limited amount of computer-generated imagery (CGI). One VFX producer said that "Len was insisting on the fact that, because we’ve got Transformers and other big CG movies coming out, this one has to feel more real. It has to be embedded in some kind of practical reality in order to give it that edge of being a Die Hard." Companies such as Digital Dimension, The Orphanage, R!ot, Pixel Magic, and Amalgamated Pixels assisted in the film's visual effects.

Digital Dimension worked on 200 visual effects shots in the film, including the sequence that shows characters John McClane and Matt Farrell crouching between two cars as another car lands on top of the other cars. To achieve this effect, a crane yanked the car and threw it in the air onto the two cars that were also being pulled by cables. The shot was completed when the two characters were integrated into the footage of the car stunt after the lighting was adjusted and CGI glass and debris were added. In the same sequence, John McClane destroys a helicopter that several of Gabriel's henchman are riding in by ramming it with a car. This was accomplished by first filming one take where one of Gabriel's henchman, Rand, jumps from the helicopter, and in the next take the car is propelled into the stationary helicopter as it is hoisted by wires. The final view of the shot overlays the two takes, with added CGI for the debris and moving rotor blades. The company also assisted in adding cars for traffic collisions and masses of people for evacuations from several government buildings.

When a F-35 jet is chasing McClane on the freeway, a miniature model and a full-size prop were both built to assist in digitally adding the jet into the scene. The nine-foot model was constructed from November 2006 through February 2007. When the jet is shown hovering near the freeway, editors used the software 3D graphics program Maya to blur the background and create a heat ripple effect.

Filming and injuries

Filming for Live Free or Die Hard started in downtown Baltimore, Maryland on September 23, 2006. Eight different sets were built on a large soundstage for filming many scenes throughout the film. When recording the sound for the semi trailer used in one of the film's final scenes, 18 microphones were used to record the engine, tires, and damage to the vehicle. Post-production for the film only took 16 weeks, when it was more common for similar films to use 26 weeks.

In order to prevent possible injuries and be in peak condition for the film, Willis worked out almost daily for several months prior to filming. Willis was injured on January 24, 2007 during a fight scene, when he was kicked above his right eye by a stunt double for actress Maggie Q who was wearing stiletto heels. Willis described the event as "no big deal" but when Len Wiseman inspected his injury, he noticed that the situation was much more serious than previously thought—in the DVD commentary, Wiseman indicates in inspecting the wound that he could see bone. Willis was hospitalized and received seven stitches which ran through his right eyebrow and down into the corner of his eye. Due to the film's non-linear production schedule, these stitches can accidentally be seen in the scene where McClane first delivers Farrell to Bowman.

Throughout filming, between 200 and 250 stunt people were used. Bruce Willis' stunt double, Larry Rippenkroeger, was knocked unconscious when he fell  from a fire escape to the pavement. Rippenkroeger suffered broken bones in his face, several broken ribs, a punctured lung, and fractures in both wrists. Due to his injuries, production was temporarily shut down. Willis personally paid the hotel bills for Rippenkroeger's parents and visited him a number of times at the hospital.

Kevin Smith recalls rewriting scenes on the set of Live Free or Die Hard in his spoken word film Sold Out: A Threevening with Kevin Smith.

Music

Soundtrack

The score for Live Free or Die Hard, written by Marco Beltrami, was released on July 2, 2007 by Varèse Sarabande (which also released the soundtracks for the first two Die Hard films), several days after the United States release of the film. This was the first film not to be scored by Michael Kamen, due to his death in 2003; Beltrami incorporates Kamen's thematic material into his score, but Kamen is not credited on the film or the album. Other songs in the film include "Rock & Roll Queen" by The Subways, "Fortunate Son" by Creedence Clearwater Revival and "I'm So Sick" by Flyleaf. Eric Lichtenfeld, reviewing from Soundtrack.net, said of the score: "The action cues, in which the entire orchestra seems percussive, flow well together."

Release

Rating
In the United States, the first three films in the Die Hard series were rated R by the Motion Picture Association of America. Live Free or Die Hard, however, was edited to obtain a PG-13 rating. In some cases, alternate profanity-free dialogue was shot and used or swearing was cut out in post-production to reduce profanity. Director Len Wiseman commented on the rating, saying "It was about three months into it [production], and I hadn't even heard that it was PG-13... But in the end, it was just trying to make the best Die Hard movie, not really thinking so much about what the rating would be."

Bruce Willis was upset with the studio's decision, stating, "I really wanted this one to live up to the promise of the first one, which I always thought was the only really good one. That's a studio decision that is becoming more and more common, because they’re trying to reach a broader audience. It seems almost a courageous move to give a picture an R rating these days. But we still made a pretty hardcore, smashmouth film." Willis said he thought that viewers unaware that it was not an R-rated film would not suspect so due to the level and intensity of the action as well as the usage of some profanity, although he admitted these elements were less intense than in the previous films. He also said that this film was the best of the four: "It's unbelievable. I just saw it last week. I personally think, it's better than the first one."

In the United Kingdom, the British Board of Film Classification awarded the film a 15 rating (including the unrated version, released later), the same rating as Die Hard with a Vengeance and Die Hard 2, albeit both were cut for both theatrical and video release, (The first film in the series originally received an 18 certificate). All films have been re-rated 15 uncut. Die Hard 4.0 was released with no cuts made and the cinema version (i.e.,the U.S. PG-13 version) consumer advice read that it "contains frequent action violence and one use of strong language". The unrated version was released on DVD as the "Ultimate Action Edition" with the consumer advice "contains strong language and violence".

In Australia, Die Hard 4.0 was released with the PG-13 cut with an M rating, the same as the others in the series (The Australian Classification Board is less strict with regards to language and to a lesser extent, violence). The unrated version was later released on DVD and Blu-ray also with an M rating. The film, notably never released in home media with its theatrical cut, has only been released in Australia as the extended edition.

Home media
The Blu-ray and DVD were released on October 29, 2007, in the United Kingdom, on October 31 in Hungary, November 20 in the United States, and December 12 in Australia. The DVD topped rental and sales charts in its opening week of release in the U.S. and Canada. There is an unrated version, which retains much of the original 'R-rated' dialogue, and a theatrical version of the film. However, the unrated version has a branching error that resulted in one of the unrated changes being omitted. The film briefly switches to the PG-13 version in the airbag scene; McClane's strong language is missing from this sequence (although international DVD releases of the unrated version are unaffected). The Blu-ray release features the PG-13 theatrical cut which runs at 128 minutes, while the Collector's Edition DVD includes both the unrated and theatrical versions. Time magazine's Richard Corliss named it one of the Top 10 DVDs of 2007, ranking it at No. 10. In 2015, the movie was featured in the "Die Hard: Nakatomi Plaza" boxed set, which featured the unrated cut of the film on Blu-Ray for the first time in the US.  In 2017, the movie was included in the "Die Hard Collection" Blu-ray set with all 5 films in it. Though unlike the DVD, the Blu-ray doesn't contain the branching error during the airbag scene.

The DVD for the film was the first to include a Digital Copy of the film which could be played on a PC or Mac computer and could also be imported into several models of portable video players. Mike Dunn, a president for 20th Century Fox, stated "The industry has sold nearly 12 billion DVDs to date, and the release of Live Free or Die Hard is the first one that allows consumers to move their content to other devices."

Reception

Box office
Live Free or Die Hard debuted at No. 2 behind Ratatouille, at the U.S. box office and made $9.1 million in its first day of release in 3,172 theaters, the best opening day take of any film in the Die Hard series (not taking inflation into account). On its opening weekend Live Free or Die Hard made $33.3 million ($48.3 million counting Wednesday and Thursday). The film made $134.5 million domestically, and $249.0 million overseas for a total of $383.5 million, making it the twelfth highest-grossing film of 2007. As of 2022, it is the most successful film in the series.

Critical response
On Rotten Tomatoes, the film has an approval rating of 82% based on 210 reviews, and an average rating of 6.8/10. The site's critical consensus reads, "Live Free or Die Hard may be preposterous, but it's an efficient, action-packed summer popcorn flick with thrilling stunts and a commanding performance by Bruce Willis. Fans of the previous Die Hard films will not be disappointed." On Metacritic, the film has a weighted average score of 69 out of 100, based on 34 critics, indicating "generally favorable reviews". Audiences polled by CinemaScore gave the film an average grade of "A−" on an A+ to F scale.

IGN stated, "Like the recent Rocky Balboa, this new Die Hard works as both its own story about an over-the-hill but still vital hero and as a nostalgia trip for those who grew up with the original films." On the television show Ebert & Roeper, film critic Richard Roeper and guest critic Katherine Tulich gave the film "two thumbs up", with Roeper stating that the film is "not the best or most exciting Die Hard, but it is a lot of fun" and that it is his favorite among the Die Hard sequels. Roeper also remarked, "Willis is in top form in his career-defining role." Michael Medved gave the film three and a half out of four stars, opining, "a smart script and spectacular special effects make this the best Die Hard of 'em all."

Conversely, Lawrence Toppman of The Charlotte Observer stated: "I can safely say I've never seen anything as ridiculous as Live Free or Die Hard." Toppman also wrote that the film had a lack of memorable villains and referred to John McClane as "just a bald Terminator with better one-liners".

References

External links

 
 
 
 
 
 
 Live Free or Die Hard soundtrack information at the Soundtrackinfo.com
 "A Farewell to Arms", Wired article on which the film's script was based

2007 films
2007 action thriller films
2000s buddy cop films
20th Century Fox films
American action thriller films
American buddy cop films
American sequel films
Die Hard
Dune Entertainment films
2000s English-language films
Independence Day (United States) films
Films scored by Marco Beltrami
Films about computing
Films about terrorism
Films based on multiple works
Films based on newspaper and magazine articles
Films directed by Len Wiseman
Films set in Maryland
Films set in Washington, D.C.
Films set in New York City
Films set in the United States
Films shot in Los Angeles
Films shot in Baltimore
Films shot in New Jersey
Films shot in Washington, D.C.
Films with screenplays by Mark Bomback
Malware in fiction
2000s American films
Films about father–daughter relationships